Peak Pobeda ("Victory") is a mountain in Sakha Republic, Russia. 

This mountain is one of the main features of the Moma Natural Park.

Geography
At  it is the highest peak of the Chersky Range. and of the East Siberian mountain system, as well as the highest mountain of Yakutia.

The mountain is located in the Buordakh Massif, part of the Ulakhan-Chistay Range, a subrange of the Chersky mountain system.

Climbing history
Italian mountaineers Simone Moro and Tamara Lunger were the first to make a winter ascent of Peak Pobeda on February 12, 2018. They reported that the temperature was about -40° C (-40° F) at base camp when they made their ascent.

See also
 List of highest points of Russian federal subjects
 List of mountains and hills of Russia
 List of ultras of Northeast Asia

References

External links

Mountains of the Sakha Republic
Chersky Range
Highest points of Russian federal subjects